Paragon International University, formerly Zaman University from 2010 to 2018, is a private university located in Phnom Penh, Cambodia. The university is accredited by the Royal Government of Cambodia and the Accreditation Committee of Cambodia (ACC). At Paragon International University, the programs are taught in English.

The university was founded in 2010 by Ali Kokten, the former chairman of Zaman International School. Currently, Paragon International School has three campuses: nursery and kindergarten, primary school, and high school. Paragon.U has eleven departments, divided into three faculties: Faculty of Engineering, Faculty of Economics and Administrative Sciences and Faculty of Information and Computer Technologies. In 2019 Paragon.U opened the School of Graduate Studies, which is currently offering a Master of Business Administration (MBA). All the undergraduate and graduate degrees are officially recognized by the Cambodian Ministry of Education, Youth and Sport (MoEYS).

Faculties

There are three faculties divided into eleven departments.

Faculty of Engineering 

 Department of Architecture (ARC)
 Department of Construction Management (CM)
 Department of Civil Engineering (CE)
 Department of Industrial Engineering (IE)
 Department of Architectural Engineering (AE)

Faculty of Economics and Administrative Sciences 

 Department of Banking and Finance (BAF)
 Department of Business Administration (BUS)
 Department of International Trade and Logistics (ITL)
 Department of Political Science and International Relations (IR)

Faculty of Information and Computer Technologies 

 Department of Management of Information Systems (MIS)
 Department of Computer Science (CS)

English Prep School

History 
In 2010, Zaman University was founded as a new member of Zaman educational institutions. The success of Zaman International Schools (Primary and High School) inspired the management board of Zaman Co. Ltd. to contribute further to Cambodia’s higher education sector by establishing Zaman University.

On 28 January 2019, Zaman University was re-branded as Paragon International University which was approved by the Ministry of Education, Youth and Sport (Cambodia).

Location 

Paragon International University has only one campus which is located in the capital city of Phnom Penh in Tuol Kork Area.

See also

 List of universities in Cambodia

References

2010 establishments in Cambodia
Education in Phnom Penh
Educational institutions established in 2010
Private education in Asia
Private universities and colleges
Universities in Cambodia